Northeastern High School (often abbreviated NHS) is a public school located in Elizabeth City, North Carolina, in the United States. It was founded in 1969, replacing Elizabeth City High School, P.W. Moore High School, and Central High School. Northeastern's mascot is the Eagle. Its school colors are green and gold. It is one of two high schools in Pasquotank County; the other is Pasquotank County High School.

Student demographics 

As of 2005, the student body was composed of approximately 435 males and 420 females with a racial dynamic of 49% African American, 47.8% Caucasian, 0.7% Asian, 1.4% Hispanic, and 1.1% multi-racial. Of the school's 855 students, 12.0% were identified academically gifted while 11.9% were identified exceptional.

Enrollment 

Northeastern High School served an average of 855 students during the 2003–04 school year. Additionally, 114 Pasquotank County High School students were served at NHS for at least one class. There were 63 transfer students, 27 students who enrolled at COA and 18 students who chose not to enroll in another educational setting. Five students were early graduates. This reflects a 7.2% decrease in transfers from 14.6% in 2002–2003 to 7.4% in 2003–2004. The state-defined dropout rate increased from 4.4% in 2002–2003 to 5.3% in 2003–2004. The percent of early graduates was almost cut in half for the third year in a row, going from 1.9% in 2002–2003 to 0.52% in 2003–2004.

Promotion rates 

89.3% of the students at Northeastern High School were promoted at the conclusion of the spring 2004 semester. This is very similar to the 90.3% promotion rate previous year. The highest number of retentions still remains at the ninth grade level with 15.3% (38 out of 248 students) not meeting promotion standards. This 15.3% is slightly lower than the 15.9% retention rate at the ninth grade level in 2003. The senior class of 2004 had 171 graduates receiving diplomas and 3 receiving certificates, reflecting a graduation rate of 98.3%.

Post-graduation plans for seniors reveal the following distribution: 51% four-year college, 23% two-year college, and 26% other. There were 56 North Carolina scholars and 37 honor graduates in the 2004 graduating class. Approximately $800,000 was awarded in scholarships to the class of 2004.

Athletics 
 Baseball
 Basketball (Men's and Women's)
 Cheerleading
 Cross Country (Men's and Women's)
 Football
 Swimming (Men's and Women's)
 Softball
 Tennis (Men's and Women's)
 Track and Field (Men's and Women's)
 Volleyball
 Soccer (Men's and Women's)
 Wrestling

Northeastern's Varsity Football team appeared in the North Carolina High School Athletic Association 2AA State Championship game on December 11, 2010, losing to Salisbury High School 30–0.  The appearance was the first in the school's history.  The Varsity Volleyball team appeared in consecutive NCHSAA 2A State Championship games in 2010 (3–1 loss to Starmount High School) and 2011 (3–0 loss to Newton-Conover High School).  The 2010 game marked the first State Championship appearance for the Lady Eagles Volleyball program.  In 1979, Carl Powell won the 180-yard Low Hurdle event at the NCHSAA Track & Field Championships.  In 2010, Alex Tavenier won the 3200 meter run at the NCHSAA 2A Track & Field Championships.

Notable alumni
 Anthony Smith, former NFL defensive end
 Kenny Williams, professional basketball player

References 

Public high schools in North Carolina
Schools in Pasquotank County, North Carolina